Billy Bowers was a comedic actor in the United States. He starred in many Siegmund Lubin comedy shorts with Oliver Hardy. He was also in films produced by Arthur Hotaling and directed by Jerold Hevener.

He was announced as a player in All Celtic Films comedies.

Filmography
Pins Are Lucky (1914)
The Green Alarm (1914) as Old Man Hokus
Casey's Birthday (1914) as Mike Dooley
Who's Boss? (1914) as Clancey 
The Fresh Air Cure (1914) as Pat McFlarrathy 
Good Cider (1914) as Hank 
They Bought a Boat (1914) as Jack Kedge
The Daddy of Them All (1914) as Chairman 
The Wise Detectives (1914)
He Wanted Work (1914) as The Boss 
A Tango Tragedy (1914)
Kidnapping the Kid (1914) as Jake
Outwitting Dad (1914)as Mr. Gross
The Crazy Clock Maker (1915), a Jerold Hevener film
What a Cinch (1915) as Cohen, the Pawnbroker 
The Prize Baby (1915) as Boots 
A Terrible Tragedy (1916) as Professor Foddletop
It Happened in Pikesville (1916) as Vimless Victor
Belinda's Bridal Breakfast (1916)

References

External links
IMDb page

American male film actors

American comedians
Year of birth missing
Year of death missing